Geysdorp is a town in Tswaing Local Municipality in the North West province of South Africa. The town is in the former Western Transvaal, some 24 km south-west of Delareyville.

History
It was laid out in 1895 on the farm "Paardefontein". Probably named after Commandant Nicolaas Claudius Gey van Pittius (1837-1893), Administrator of the Boer republic of Goshen.

References

Populated places in the Tswaing Local Municipality